Matapa celsina, is a butterfly in the family Hesperiidae. It is found in Celebes, and the Banggai Islands.

The length of the forewings is 21.1-25 mm for males and 23.2–25.5 mm for females. The upperside is dark brown with greenish sheen. Tip of abdomen is yellow.

References

Butterflies described in 1867
Erionotini
Butterflies of Indochina